Ramm may refer to the following people
Given name
 Ramm Hansen (1879–1971) Norwegian born American architect

Surname
 Alexander Ramm (born 1940), American mathematician
 Alexandra Ramm-Pfemfert (1883–1963), German-Russian translator, publisher and gallery owner
 Benjamin Ramm (born 1982), British commentator on liberal politics
 Bernard Ramm (1916–1992), American Baptist theologian and apologist
 Eilert Waldemar Preben Ramm (1769–1837), Norwegian military officer
 Colin Ramm (1921–2014), Australian particle physicist
 Eva Ramm (born 1925), Norwegian psychologist, essayist, novelist and children's writer
 Fredrik Ramm (1892–1943), Norwegian journalist
 Friedrich Ramm (1744–1813), German oboist
 Haley Ramm (born 1992), American actress
 Harald Ramm (1895–1970), Norwegian barrister
 John Ramm, English comedian and actor
 Leandra Ramm (born 1984), American singer-songwriter, actress and television performer
 Nikolai Ramm Østgaard (1885–1958), Norwegian military officer
 Nick Ramm, British pianist and composer
 Nils Ramm (1903–1986), Swedish boxer
 Nils Arntzen Ramm (1903–1974), Norwegian engineer, military captain, and businessperson
 Olaf von Ramm, Canadian engineer
 Regine Ramm Bjerke (born 1949), Norwegian judge
 Wilhelm Ramm (1921–1982), Norwegian chess player

Band
 Rammstein, German heavy-metal band